Szczechów  (or Szczechowo) is a village in Gmina Świerzawa, Złotoryja County, Lower Silesian Voivodeship, Poland.

References

Podgorki